Jacob Kiplimo (born 14 November 2000) is a Ugandan long-distance runner. He is the 2020 Tokyo Olympic 10,000 metres bronze medallist and also won bronze in the event at the 2022 World Athletics Championships. Kiplimo earned gold medals for the 5000 metres and 10,000 m at the 2022 Commonwealth Games. He is the 2020 World Half Marathon champion. He won silver (at age 18) and gold medal at the 2019 and 2023 World Cross Country Championships respectively. Kiplimo holds the world record in the half marathon in a time of 57:31, set on 21 November 2021 in Lisbon.

At age 15, he represented his country at the 2016 Rio Olympics, becoming the youngest ever Olympian for Uganda. He was the 2017 World Cross Country junior champion. Kiplimo is also the Ugandan record holder for the 3000 metres.

Early life
A member of the Sebei ethnic group, Jacob Kiplimo grew up in Bukwo on Mount Elgon, living at a high altitude.

Career

2015–2018
At the age of fifteen, Kiplimo won the 10,000 metres bronze medal at the 2016 IAAF World U20 Championships behind fellow East Africans Rodgers Kwemoi and Aron Kifle. Of as much importance as that placing was his time of 13:24:40 minutes for the 5000 metres in Rome that May. That was enough to reach the Olympic standard and gain selection for Uganda at the 2016 Summer Olympics. As a result, he became the youngest ever Olympian for Uganda.

Before the 2016 Rio Olympics, he improved his 5000 m best to 13:19.54 minutes. The youngest entrant to the competition, he ran in the Olympic heats only, recording a time of 13:30.40 minutes for 11th in his race. He was the youngest ever competitor for Uganda at the Olympic Games, at the age of 15.

At age 16, Kiplimo produced a performance of a lifetime to win gold in the men's U20 race at the 2017 World Cross Country Championships in Kampala, the country's first-ever gold medal at a World Cross, covering a 8 km course in 22:40 minutes.

He won the San Silvestre Vallecana 10 km road race in Madrid in a time of 26:41 on 31 December 2018. As the course has an elevation drop, it didn't count for record purposes. His win set a new course record, formerly held by Eliud Kipchoge since 2006 with 26:54.

2019
At the Ugandan Cross Country Championships on 16 February in Tororo, Kiplimo defeated Joshua Cheptegei by placing first and second, respectively. In the men's senior race over 10 km, Kiplimo won by an 11-second lead over the 10,000 m world championship runner-up.

At the World Cross Country Championships in Aarhus, Denmark, Kiplimo finished second in the senior men's race four seconds after Joshua Cheptegei's winning time of 31:40. He won the gold medal in the teams ranking with Cheptegei from Uganda.

Kiplimo did not run in the 10,000 metres at the World Athletics Championships in Doha because of an injury.

On 31 December, Kiplimo ran the Saint Silvester Road Race (15 km) in São Paulo and was beaten by Kibiwott Kandie at the finish line. Kandie won in 42:59, a new course record, with Kiplimo finishing in 43:00.

2020
On 8 September, Kiplimo won the 5000 m run in Ostrava, Czech Republic in a time of 12:48.63 and improved his personal best of 13:13.64 set as a 16-year-old at the 2017 Prefontaine Classic. Selemon Barega was the runner up with a time 12:49.08, while his personal best of 12:43.02 was the fifth-fastest ever at the time. On 17 September, Kiplimo won a Diamond League 3000 m run in Rome in a time of 7:26.64, the fastest mark since Kenenisa Bekele's 7:25.70 in August 2007. Kiplimo's time was the eighth-fastest of all time and second-placed Jakob Ingebrigtsen's mark of 7:27.05 became the ninth.

Kiplimo won the Half Marathon World Championship in a time of 58:49 on 17 October in Gdynia, Poland. His mark was a Ugandan record and championship record. 

On 6 December, he competed in the Valencia Half Marathon against the world half marathon silver medalist Kibiwott Kandie. Kiplimo faced also Rhonex Kipruto of Kenya, who made his half marathon debut and held the world record in the 10 km on the road. With just around one kilometer remaining, Kandie made a strong move for the victory, and Kiplimo could not keep up with his surge. At the end of it all, Kandie, Kiplimo, Kipruto, and also Alexander Mutiso of Kenya all broke the previous world record of 58:01, set by Kenya's Geoffrey Kamworor back in September 2019 in Copenhagen. Kandie finished in a world record time of 57:32, with Kiplimo finishing just behind in a Ugandan record of 57:37. Kipruto also set a debut world record with a time of 57:49, with Mutiso finishing in 57:59.

2021
On 21 March 2021, Kiplimo competed at the Campaccio cross country race in San Giorgio su Legnano, Italy. Despite falling during the ninth kilometer of the race, he won a 10 km in 29:07. Ethiopia's Nebret Melak finished second, and Kiplimo's younger brother Oscar Chelimo finished third. On 19 May, Kiplimo returned to the track racing 10,000 m at the 60th Ostrava Golden Spike. He pulled away from Bahrain's Birhanu Balew to win the race. Kiplimo finished in a personal best time of 26:33.93, which made him the seventh-fastest 10,000 m performer of all time and the second-fastest Ugandan in history over the distance behind world record holder Joshua Cheptegei's 26:11.00. 

On 21 November 2021, Kiplimo set a half marathon world record at 57:31 in Lisbon.

2023
On 18 February, Kiplimo won the gold medal in the 10-kilometer race at the World Cross Country Championships held in Bathurst, Australia with a time of 29:17. Ethopian Berihu Aregawi finished second in 29:26 followed by Joshua Cheptegei (29:37), world record holder for the 5000 m and 10,000 m, who had been defending his title from Aarhus 2019. Thus, Kiplimo became reigning world half marathon and cross country champion.

Achievements
All information from World Athletics profile.

Personal bests
 1500 metres – 3:50.24 (Arezzo 2016)
 3000 metres – 7:26.64 (Rome 2020) 
 5000 metres – 12:48.63 (Ostrava 2020)
 10,000 metres – 26:33.93 (Ostrava 2021)
 10,000 meters - 29:17 (Sydney 2023)
Road
 10 kilometres – 27:31 (Manchester 2019)
 Half marathon – 57:31 (Lisbon 2021) World record

International competitions

Circuit wins
 Diamond League
 2020: Rome Golden Gala (3000m)

References

External links
 

2000 births
Athletes (track and field) at the 2016 Summer Olympics
Athletes (track and field) at the 2018 Commonwealth Games
Living people
Olympic athletes of Uganda
People from Bukwo District
Ugandan male long-distance runners
World Athletics Championships athletes for Uganda
Commonwealth Games competitors for Uganda
Olympic bronze medalists for Uganda
Athletes (track and field) at the 2020 Summer Olympics
Medalists at the 2020 Summer Olympics
Olympic bronze medalists in athletics (track and field)
21st-century Ugandan people
Athletes (track and field) at the 2022 Commonwealth Games
Commonwealth Games gold medallists for Uganda
Commonwealth Games medallists in athletics
Ugandan expatriates in Italy
World Athletics Cross Country Championships winners
Medallists at the 2022 Commonwealth Games